Eurymycter is a genus of fungus weevils in the beetle family Anthribidae. There are at least four described species in Eurymycter.

Species
These four species belong to the genus Eurymycter:
 Eurymycter bicarinatus Pierce, 1930
 Eurymycter fasciatus (Olivier, 1795)
 Eurymycter latifascia Pierce, 1930
 Eurymycter tricarinatus Pierce, 1930

References

Further reading

 
 

Anthribidae
Articles created by Qbugbot